Riptech is a network security company in the United States. It was acquired by Symantec on July 17, 2002, for $145 million.

References

Defunct software companies of the United States
Gen Digital acquisitions